Eiffel is a 2021 French romantic drama film directed by Martin Bourboulon, from a script written by Caroline Bongrand. The film stars Romain Duris as Gustave Eiffel and follows a fictionalized romance between Eiffel and Adrienne Bourgès, his childhood sweetheart, played by Emma Mackey. It also stars Pierre Deladonchamps in a supporting role.

Eiffel premiered on 2 March 2021 at the Alliance Française French Film Festival in Australia, and was released in France on 13 October 2021, by Pathé Distribution. The film received mostly positive reviews, and grossed over $13 million worldwide.

Plot
Gustave Eiffel looks over Paris from the tower that he has conceived, designed, and delivered. He casts his mind back to when he was supervising the building of an iron bridge over the River Garonne at the town of Bordeaux. One of his workmen fell into the dangerously turbulent waters of the river. Unhesitatingly, he dived in and rescued the man. By chance driving by, Adrienne Bourgès, then unknown to Eiffel, saw the rescue. To prevent further such accidents, Eiffel asked a wealthy local bourgeois, who by chance happened to be Adrienne's father, for wood for safety scaffolding. Bourgès invited him to lunch, where he sat with many others including Adrienne, who pretended that she hadn't seen the rescue, but still indicated that she admired him. She spoke up to her father to support Eiffel's request for wood for scaffolding. He was struck to the heart by her beauty, dash, and grace. As he left, she invited him to her coming birthday party. At the last moment, she confessed that she had seen the rescue.

Threaded through the film are more memories. As Eiffel designs the Tour, he recalls the birthday party, at which they played musical chairs, and Eiffel and Adrienne smiled at each other. When she saw him alone, as a birthday present, he gave her a copy of an old book on the art of building metal bridges. She told him that she recognised his individuality, and suddenly kissed him on the cheek. Surprised, he withdrew as she rejoined the many at the party.

Another time during the building of the bridge over the Garonne, one evening, she went walking around the works and they encountered each other. He invited her into his office or quarters. He told her that she was charming, but still a spoiled child, just toying with him. She walked out in dudgeon. He soon called after her, but she kept walking and deliberately fell backwards into the river. He ran and jumped in to rescue her. They were wet and cold. He lit the stove in his office, put a blanket on her, and they held each other to get warm. Then they kissed closely, and again. And more closely.

Soon their passion grew. They thought of marriage. These memories perhaps sustain Eiffel through the vicissitudes of his delivery of the Tour. Suddenly, Adrienne went away from home. Her father told Eiffel that she had been stringing him along, and no longer wanted to marry him. Eiffel didn't believe him, and seized him by his coat lapels. Bourgès threw Eiffel to the ground and drove off. Eiffel picked himself up and resolved to wait for Adrienne. Her mother and father told her she couldn't marry Eiffel because he wasn't good enough for her. She replied that she was expecting his baby. She ran out of the house, chased by her father. Finding the gates closed, she climbed up to go over them, but fell on one of their points, and sustained a penetrating abdominal wound.

These memories also come up when Adrienne and Eiffel meet during the construction of the Tour, and Eiffel sees the scar from the old injury; they recall their youthful passion. The baby was lost, and Adrienne was still wounded, when she married Antoine de Restac. For this reason, and for the sake of Eiffel's reputation and the Tour, Adrienne stays with her husband and renounces Eiffel, who thereupon orders the construction to be completed with rivets instead of bolts, so that the Tour can never be torn down.

Cast

Reception

Peter Debruge of Variety wrote that "Not a biopic so much as a sketchy piece of historical fiction, Eiffel identifies itself as 'librement inspiré de faits réels,' which roughly translates to 'a made-up crock of hooey'." David Stratton of The Australian wrote that "I am a man with an idea greater than himself, Eiffel tells the various interested parties when he makes his formal bid to build the tower. I think the director of this film took that line to heart, and I am glad he did". Nesselson of Screen International wrote that "Ambitious, handsomely appointed and unapologetically old-fashioned".

References

External links
 
 

2021 films
2021 romantic drama films
2021 biographical drama films
2020s French-language films
2020s historical drama films
2000s historical romance films
Pathé films
French romantic drama films
French historical romance films
French historical drama films
French biographical drama films
Romantic period films
Cultural depictions of engineers
Films about architecture
Films scored by Alexandre Desplat
Films set in 1860
Films set in 1886
Films set in 1889
Films set in the 1860s
Films set in the 1880s
Films set in Paris
Films set in Île-de-France
Films set in Bordeaux
Films shot in Paris
Films shot in Île-de-France
Films shot in France
Gustave Eiffel
Eiffel Tower in fiction
World's fairs in fiction
2020s French films
2000s French films